Rafael Álvarez may refer to:

 Rafael Álvarez (baseball) (born 1977), Venezuelan baseball player
 Rafael Álvarez (diver) (born 1971), Spanish diver
 Rafael Alvarez (born 1958), American author